(1937 - February 4, 2015) was a former Japanese international table tennis player.

He won a bronze medal at the 1956 World Table Tennis Championships in the men's singles.

See also
 List of table tennis players
 List of World Table Tennis Championships medalists

References

Japanese male table tennis players
World Table Tennis Championships medalists
1937 births

2015 deaths
Place of birth missing